Wilson Shannon Bissell (December 31, 1847 – October 6, 1903) was an American politician from New York and considered one of the foremost Democratic leaders of Western New York.

Early life
Bissell was born on December 31, 1847, in New London, Oneida County, New York. He was the son of John Bissell (1808–1889), a prominent forwarding merchant in Buffalo, and Isabella Jeanette (née Hally) Bissell (1813–1885). His older brother, Arthur Douglas Bissell, was the president of the New York State Bankers Association and president of the People's Bank of Buffalo.  He was of Scotch-Irish ancestry.

He prepared at Hopkins Grammar School in New Haven, Connecticut and graduated from Yale University in 1869 and was a member of Skull and Bones.

Career
Following his graduation from Yale, he began the study of law in Buffalo with Lanning, Cleveland & Folsom. He was admitted to the bar in 1871 and began practicing.

From 1873 to 1882 he was a law partner of future President Grover Cleveland and acted as chief groomsman when Cleveland was married.  Bissell entered Democratic Party politics as a candidate for Presidential Elector in 1888. He served as Postmaster General under Cleveland from 1893 to 1895.  In 1896, he was a delegate to the 1896 Democratic National Convention.

Apgar's Corners in Tewksbury Township, New Jersey was renamed in 1893 to the village of Bissell in an effort to sway him into ordering that a post office be created in the settlement. A small post office building (no longer in existence) was established soon thereafter.

From 1902 until his death in 1903, Bissell served as the Chancellor of the University of Buffalo.

Personal life
On February 6, 1890, Bissell was married to Louise Fowler Sturges (1866–1921) of Geneva, New York. They were the parents of one child.

Bissell died at age 55 on October 6, 1903, at his residence in Buffalo, New York.  After a funeral at Trinity Episcopal Church in Buffalo (where former President Cleveland was a pallbearer), his body was cremated and his ashes were buried in the family lot at Forest Lawn Cemetery, Buffalo.

References

External links

1847 births
1903 deaths
Burials at Forest Lawn Cemetery (Buffalo)
Politicians from Buffalo, New York
Leaders of the University at Buffalo
Yale University alumni
New York (state) lawyers
United States Postmasters General
Politicians from Rome, New York
Cleveland administration cabinet members
19th-century American politicians